Alan Quinn (born 13 June 1979 in Dublin) is an Irish former professional footballer who played as a midfielder.

He is one of nine brothers; both Stephen and Keith were on the books at Alan's former club, Sheffield United while another brother, Gerry, played for St Patrick's Athletic in the League of Ireland, the club which his cousin Joe Redmond also plays for. Quinn has also played for Sheffield Wednesday, and is the only player to have scored for both teams in the Steel City derby. During his playing career he also played for Sunderland and Ipswich Town.

Club career
Quinn played youth football in Dublin for Old Church United, Manortown United and Cherry Orchard.

Sheffield Wednesday
Quinn started his English club career at Sheffield Wednesday, making his first appearance as a substitute during 1997–98 and his first start the following season. After two games in his first two seasons his career took off during 1999–00 and he eventually played 178 League and Cup games for Wednesday, scoring 17 times.

After 6 games on loan to Sunderland, and winning OwlsOnline.com player of the year award for the 2002–03 season he moved to Wednesday's rivals Sheffield United on a free transfer in 2004 after no clubs came in with a bid for the out of favour player.

Sheffield United
After a couple of substitute appearances he made his full debut for the Blades in a 1–0 away victory at Preston North End on 8 August 2004. He scored his first goal for the club a couple of weeks later in a 2–1 home defeat by West Ham United. He was a regular in the starting eleven in his first season at Bramall Lane but in later years Quinn found first team football more difficult to come by.

With the Blades promoted to the Premier League for the 2006–07 season he could not hold down a regular spot, with his younger brother Stephen being preferred ahead of him for a time. Despite that Quinn made 19 Premier League appearances that season and was rewarded in July 2007 with a contract extension until 2010.

Following United's relegation back to the Championship, Alan failed to impress new manager Bryan Robson enough to convince him that he was worth a place in the first team and made only a handful of appearances. The club allowed him to leave for free during the January transfer window, meaning Quinn never commanded a transfer fee throughout his career.

Ipswich Town
On 18 January 2008 Quinn signed for Ipswich Town on an emergency loan, after an undisclosed fee was agreed. The transfer was made permanent on 23 January 2008, with Quinn signing a three and a half-year contract. He was allocated the number 25 shirt and scored four minutes into his second appearance for Ipswich against his former team Sheffield Wednesday. He also scored a goal in the East Anglian Derby at Portman Road in April 2009.

Handsworth
In 2014, he signed for Handsworth.

International career
At Youth level he won the 1998 U-18 European Championships with Republic of Ireland in a team that also featured Robbie Keane and Richard Dunne, scoring in the final. the match finished 1–1 AET with Rep. Of Ireland winning on penalties.

Quinn won his first senior cap for the Republic of Ireland against Norway on 30 April 2003 and went on to earn 8 caps.

Career statistics

International
Source:

Honours
Sheffield United
Football League Championship runner-up: 2005–06

Individual
Sheffield Wednesday Player of the Year: 2002–03

References

External links
Alan Quinn player profile at itfc.co.uk

1979 births
Living people
Association footballers from County Dublin
Republic of Ireland association footballers
Republic of Ireland international footballers
Association football midfielders
Cherry Orchard F.C. players
Sheffield Wednesday F.C. players
Sunderland A.F.C. players
Sheffield United F.C. players
Ipswich Town F.C. players
Handsworth F.C. players
Premier League players
English Football League players